Moldir Zhangbyrbay  (born 18 May 1997) is a Kazakhstani  Professional karateka, she is currently represents Kazakhstan internationally Kumite (Karate) event.

Career
She is three time gold medalist  in Asian Karate Championships (Continental Championship) in individual Kumite U-50 Kg Category in the year of 2018 in Japan and 2017 in Kazakhstan and she also won several medals in the World Karate Federation Karate 1 Leagues  and Series Championships. She also won the gold medal in her event at the 2021 Asian Karate Championships held in Almaty, Kazakhstan.

In 2018 Asian Games was eliminated in her second match  (quarterfinal) by Paweena Raksachart of Thailand in the Individual Women's Kumite 50 Kg.

Achievements 
She has qualified at the World Olympic Qualification Tournament in Paris, France to represent  Kazakhstan in  Women’s -55 Kg Kumite Category  at the Karate competition of the 2020 Summer Olympics in Tokyo, Japan.

References 

Living people
Kazakhstani female karateka
Karateka at the 2018 Asian Games
Karateka at the 2020 Summer Olympics
1997 births
Asian Games karateka
Olympic karateka of Kazakhstan
20th-century Kazakhstani women
21st-century Kazakhstani women